Anton Alexander may refer to:

 Anton Alexander (politician) (1870–1945), Norwegian educator and politician
 Anton Alexander (actor), English actor

See also
 Count Anton Alexander von Auersperg (1806–1876), Austrian poet and politician